Ramblin' Rose is a Nat King Cole album. It was released by Capitol Records in 1962, and features the popular title track. The LP peaked at #3 on Billboards album chart where it remained for more than a year. It was Nat's second gold album.

Track listing
 "Ramblin' Rose" (Noel Sherman, Joe Sherman) – 2:46
 "Wolverton Mountain" (Merle Kilgore, Claude King) – 3:03
 "Twilight on the Trail" (Sidney D. Mitchell, Louis Alter) – 2:51
 "I Don't Want it that Way" (Noel Sherman, Joe Sherman) – 1:57
 "He'll Have to Go" (Joe Allison, Audrey Allison) – 2:25
 "When You're Smiling" (Larry Shay, Mark Fisher, Joe Goodwin) – 2:42
 "Goodnight, Irene, Goodnight" (Huddie Ledbetter, John Lomax) – 3:08
 "Your Cheatin' Heart" (Hank Williams) – 2:25
 "One Has My Name the Other Has My Heart" (Eddie Dean, Hal Blair, Dearst Dean) – 2:18
 "Skip to My Lou" (Traditional) – 2:00
 "The Good Times" (Ron Miller) - 2:44
 "Sing Another Song (And We'll All Go Home)" (Johnny Burke, Colin Romoff) - 2:19

Personnel

Performance 
 Nat King Cole – vocal
 Belford Hendricks – arranger, conductor

Certifications

References

1962 albums
Nat King Cole albums
Albums conducted by Belford Hendricks
Albums arranged by Belford Hendricks
Capitol Records albums

Albums recorded at Capitol Studios